This is a discography of the punk rock band Bayside. Since forming in 2000 the band has released 8 studio albums, several EPs and one live album.

Studio albums

Live albums

Extended plays

Singles

Music videos
Loveless Wrists (2003)
Masterpiece (2004)
Devotion and Desire (2005)
Duality (2007)
Carry On (2008)
No One Understands (2008)
Sick, Sick, Sick (2010)
Time Has Come (2014)
Pigsty (2014)
Pretty Vacant (2016)
I've Been Dead All Day (2016)
Mary (2017)
It Don't Exist (2018)
Interrobang (2019)
Light Me Up (2020)
Strangest Faces (2022)

Appearances on compilations
From Brooklyn With Love (Dying Wish Records, 2002) – Song featured: Count The Score & Advance Letter Goodbye
Punk vs. Emo (2003) – Song featured: Loveless Wrists
Bad Scene, Everyone's Fault: Jawbreaker Tribute (Dying Wish Records, 2003) – Song featured: Chemistry
Dead And Dreaming: An Indie Tribute To Counting Crows Tribute (The Vinyl Summer Records, 2004) – Song featured: A Long December
'Resident Evil: Extinction' Official Soundtrack (Lakeshore Records, 2007) – Song featured: Duality (Project Alice String Remix)
Warped Tour 2007 Tour Compilation (Sideonedummy Records, 2007) – Song featured: Duality
Punk Goes Pop 2 (Fearless Records, 2009) – Song featured: Beautiful Girls (Cover)
Take Action! Vol. 8 (Hopeless Records, 2009) – Song featured: You've Already Been
Take Action! Vol. 10 (Hopeless Records, 2011) – Song featured: Battle Scars
Bayside/Saves The Day/I Am The Avalanche/Transit 7" Split (Rise Records, 2011) – Song featured: Sick, Sick, Sick (Demo)
Bridge and Tunnel Original Motion Picture Soundtrack - Song Featured: Indiana.
 Green Day: The Early Years (2017) – "Burnout" (Green Day cover)

References

Discographies of American artists